4-Chlorophthalic anhydride is a monochlorinated aromatic anhydride. It is an isomer of 3-chlorophthalic anhydride and a derivative of phthalic anhydride.

Properties 
It has a melting point of around 99 °C. Like most acid anhydrides, it can hydrolyze in the presence of water.

Production 
It can be produced by chlorination of phthalic anhydride.

Applications 
It may be used to produce herbicides and pesticides, intermediates for active pharmaceutical ingredients and can be used as a monomer for the production of polyimides.

References 
  Chlorination of phthalic anhydride  http://www.freepatentsonline.com/4297283.html

Chloroarenes
Phthalic anhydrides